Uruguay competed at the 1956 Summer Olympics in Melbourne, Australia. 21 competitors, all men, took part in 8 events in 5 sports.

Medalists

Bronze
 Oscar Moglia, Ariel Olascoaga, Milton Scarón, Carlos Gonzáles, Sergio Matto, Raúl Mera, Héctor Costa, Nelson Demarco, Héctor Garcia, Carlos Blixen, Nelson Chelle, and Ramiro Cortes — Basketball, Men's Team Competition

Athletics

Fermín Donazar

Basketball

Carlos Blixen
Ramiro Cortes
Héctor Costa
Nelson Chelle
Nelson Demarco
Héctor García Otero
Carlos González
Sergio Matto
Oscar Moglia
Raúl Mera
Ariel Olascoaga
Milton Scaron

Cycling

Time trial
Luis Pedro Serra — 1:12.3 (→ 5th place)

Team pursuit
Alberto VelázquezEduardo PuertollanoLuis Pedro SerraRené Deceja — 14th place

Individual road race
René Deceja — 5:31:58 (→ 33rd place)
Alberto Velázquez — did not finish (→ no ranking)
Eduardo Puertollano — did not finish (→ no ranking)
Raymundo Moyano — did not finish (→ no ranking)

Fencing

One fencer represented Uruguay in 1956.

Men's sabre
Teodoro Goliardi

Rowing

Uruguay had two male rowers participate in one out of seven rowing events in 1956.

 Men's double sculls
 Paulo Carvalho
 Miguel Seijas

References

External links
Montevideo.com
Official Olympic Reports
International Olympic Committee results database

Nations at the 1956 Summer Olympics
1956
1956 in Uruguayan sport